Nusantara Development Initiatives (NDI) is a nonprofit social enterprise that focuses on women, technology, and social impact. Its flagship program, Program Rumah Terang Nusantara (Mothers of Light Program), aims to end energy poverty and create growth in Indonesian villages by training rural women to become solar lamp entrepreneurs.

NDI was incorporated as a Company Limited by Guarantee in Singapore in 2010. In 2014, it moved its operational arm to Indonesia and was legally registered as a Yayasan in Indonesia.  Presently, it has offices in Singapore and Jakarta, and a presence in Bali.

The Team
NDI was co-founded by three founding members- Fairoz Ahmad, Angela Sujadi and Gloria Arlini.  The day-to-day operation is led directly by Fairoz Ahmad as NDI's Executive Director, supported by a team of staff in Singapore, Jakarta and Bali.

NDI is also supported by an active network of volunteers.

Core Program - Program Rumah Terang Nusantara
Program Rumah Terang Nusantara (also known as the Mothers of Light Programme) aims to bring sustainable development in rural areas without adequate access to lighting.  It does so through effective, low-cost intervention in the form of solar-powered lamps, which have been shown to significantly improve the quality of rural livelihood.

The Problem of Energy Poverty
About 1 in 3 Indonesians, representing about 75 million people in Indonesia, do not have adequate access to electricity. 50% of them are located in non-electrified remote rural villages, and mostly rely on traditional sources of lighting such as kerosene lamps, oil wicks and candles.   The use of these traditional lighting creates health problems due to excessive intake of particulate-laden kerosene fumes and exposes users to fire hazard.  It further harms the environment as toxic substances like Volatile Organic Compound (VOCs) and carbon are released into the atmosphere.

However, existing clean energy innovations and other high-impact technologies are rarely able to reach the Bottom of the Pyramid (BoP) market, which often falls beyond the reach of the mainstream distribution network.  Furthermore, customers in the BoP market are likely unable to afford such technology given their low and unstable income.

To bridge this gap and allow rural communities to access cheap, safe and clean sources of lighting, NDI creates a rural distribution network that taps on local women networks.  It trains rural women to become last-mile entrepreneurs of solar-powered lamps for rural market.  
Many studies have shown that women have massive untapped potentials, among others strong social network and financial savvy.  For instance, the USAID have found that for every dollar that a woman earns, 90 cents is reinvested to the family, as opposed to about 40 cents for men.  Hence investing in women is generally believed to create a ripple effect of benefits that can extend to their family and community.

Program Overview

The first phase of the Program Rumah Terang Nusantara saw the introduction of solar lamp as a viable option to replace kerosene as the main source of lighting in rural communities.  NDI identified Pulau Air Raja, Kecamatan Galang, Batam, Kepulauan Riau Province, Indonesia, as a suitable project site.  The NDI team worked closely with the village leadership to introduce this new technology to the community through public forums and free product trials.

Following a series of house-to-house market assessment survey to understand the rural community's income level and energy consumption patterns, the team designed a suitable financing mechanism for the lamp in the form of weekly installment.  The feedback from the community was overwhelmingly positive and the subsequent adoption rate of the solar lamp was high.

This was followed by a second phase which focused on women entrepreneurship training, with the main objective of extending the reach of the solar powered lamp to surrounding villages. The pilot class consisted of eight rural women who were selected to take part in this entrepreneurship training programme.

Key Program Features
NDI designs a customized entrepreneurship training program, the Program Rumah Terang Nusantara, to suit the rural context- where most women had little formal education with basic literacy and numeracy skills.  The training is structured to be highly interactive and includes modules like product knowledge, marketing, sales and bookkeeping.  This is followed by a guided practicum session where the women practice their newly acquired skills in a new environment beyond their immediate social circle, such as a neighbouring village.

Instead of the micro-credit system, NDI adopts a micro-consignment model to ensure that the women entrepreneurs will not fall into debt. The entrepreneurs obtain the solar lamp inventories upfront and pay NDI only after they have successfully made sales, instead of paying upfront.  Moreover, they earn a commission for every lamp sales made, which helps to supplement their household income.

The participants who successfully complete the entire training programme are invited to a graduation ceremony, where they are given an official program T-shirt and a “business-in-a-bag” start-up kit.  They are officially known as Ibu Rumah Terang (Mothers of Light).  They work in partnership with NDI as last-mile entrepreneurs to reach the bottom of the pyramid market in Indonesia with solar lamps and other high impact products and services.

Scaling Up
Having successfully implemented the Program Rumah Terang Nusantara in its pilot village in Pulau Air Raja, NDI aims to replicate the program in other areas in Indonesia.

In 2013, NDI did their second pilot program in Pengujan, Tanjung Pinang, which subsequently failed due to unsuitable village conditions.  Learning from this failure, one year later in 2014, it started the program in a third site, Pasir Panjang, Kec. Rempang Cate, Galang, successfully.  In 2015, NDI worked with grassroot volunteers to do a large-scale energy survey in villages in Lampung, Pekanbaru and East Java, and shortlisted another 8 villages to implement the program.

Building on its customized training material and adopting the Train-the-Trainer approach, NDI further pursues a nationwide scale-up plan by developing partnership with local NGOs in Indonesia that share its vision of women empowerment to broaden the reach of Program Rumah Terang Nusantara.

Impact
As of 2015, NDI has created employment for 22 rural women in 3 villages in the Riau Islands province, Indonesia. They in turn, have sold close to 3000 solar lamps, benefitting almost 12,000 people in 25 surrounding villages.

Without having to be dependent upon kerosene, the rural beneficiaries of the project enjoy a cumulative cost savings of about US$128,000  in 1 year.

Awards and recognition
NDI's Program Rumah Terang has won recognition in regional and international competitions, most notably:

-Social Capital Markets (SOCAP) 2014 Scholarship

-Young Social Entrepreneur Forum at the Asia Pacific Cities Summit 2013 (Achievement: Grand Prize Winner and Audience Favourite) 

-Start-Up @Singapore 2013 (Achievement: 2nd Prize Social Venture Category)

-Global Social Venture Competition 2013 (Achievement: Finalist- Top 11 Southeast Asia)

-Project Inspire 2012 by UN Women Singapore (Achievement: Finalist- Top 9 Global)

NDI was also invited by Dr. Kuntoro Mangkusubroto, the outgoing Chairman of President's Delivery Unit for Development Monitoring and Oversight (Unit Kerja Presiden bidang Pengawasan dan Pengendalian Pembangunan, abbreviated UKP4) to deliver a presentation on Project Light to his team in Jakarta, Indonesia, in 2011.

Media Coverage
In recent years, NDI has been featured in the following global and local publications:

-The Straits Times, 20 September 2014, “50 Ideas to Change The World” (part of the global Impact Journalism Day) 

-Singapore Yahoo! News, 16 January 2014, “Singapore based charity powers Indonesian villages with light” 

-The Huffington Post, 13 January 2014 “Mothers Light Up Indonesia”

-Fairoz Ahmad at TEDxKRP, 27 November 2012, “Doing Good: A Flipside View”

Technology for Development
NDI believes in the power of technology for development.  In its work, NDI actively adopts relevant technology, be it to directly create social impact, improve workflow efficiency or add value to the community of beneficiaries.

Mobile Reporting System
One of the earliest technologies that NDI adopted was a mobile reporting system.  This stemmed from its observation that the manual data entry that were used by the women entrepreneurs and the village coordinator was time-consuming and prone to inaccuracies.  With the mobile reporting system, sales and inventory information can be sent from villages to NDI's central dashboard in real time, thereby improving communication and work efficiency.

The IT Collection
In 2015, NDI launched The IT Collection to cater to the growing interest of urban consumers in solar lamps.  The IT Collection is an online platform that features high-impact technology that effects social change.  It targets both individual and corporations who may need the lamps for personal use and Corporate Social Responsibility projects respectively.

NDI Ideas Lab
The Ideas Lab, established in 2015, provides an incubator space within NDI to test and execute new ideas under the broad theme of Women, Technology and Social Impact. Utilizing design thinking as the core methodology, the NDI Ideas Lab focuses on tech-based projects that aim to improve the lives of women in both rural and urban areas, across Singapore and Indonesia.

References

Economy of Indonesia